Peter Jánošík (born 2 January 1988) is a Slovak footballer who plays as centre back for TJ KOVO Beluša.

Career
In 2019, Jánošík joined KOVO Beluša.

References

External links

Profile at football-lineups.com

1988 births
Living people
People from Dubnica nad Váhom
Sportspeople from the Trenčín Region
Association football central defenders
Slovak footballers
Slovak expatriate footballers
Slovakia youth international footballers
FK Dubnica players
FK Dukla Banská Bystrica players
ŠK Slovan Bratislava players
Czech First League players
FC Hradec Králové players
Spartak Myjava players
Polonia Bytom players
MFK Skalica players
Slovak Super Liga players
2. Liga (Slovakia) players
3. Liga (Slovakia) players
Expatriate footballers in the Czech Republic
Expatriate footballers in Poland
Slovak expatriate sportspeople in Poland
Slovak expatriate sportspeople in the Czech Republic